The 9th Gold Cup was a motor race, run for Formula One cars, held on 1 September 1962 at Oulton Park, England. The race was run over 73 laps of the circuit, and was won by British driver Jim Clark in a Lotus 25.

Grid

Results

References
 "The Grand Prix Who's Who", Steve Small, 1995.
 "The Formula One Record Book", John Thompson, 1974.

International Gold Cup
International Gold Cup
Gold